The Rabie Ridge Stadium is located in Rabie Ridge, a suburb of Johannesburg, South Africa. It is used mostly for football matches and was utilized as a training field for teams participating in the 2010 FIFA World Cup after seating, change rooms, and stadium management facilities were renovated in 2010 and brought up to FIFA standards.

References

External links
 Satellite Map of Rabie Ridge Stadium

Soccer venues in South Africa
Sports venues in Johannesburg